Tobago United Football Club was a football club from Trinidad and Tobago, that played in Professional Football League of Trinidad.

The team's home stadium was Dwight Yorke Stadium, 3 km from Scarborough, Tobago's main town.

History
Ensuring survival was the main ambition for the Trinidad and Tobago TT Pro League side Tobago United. Since they joined the league in 2003, Tobago United finished bottom in 2003, 2004, 2005, 2006, 2007 and 2008. The club managed to avoid bottom place in 2009 with help from former Manchester United and Trinidad and Tobago national football team forward Dwight Yorke. However they were expelled from the TT Pro League early in the 2010 season and have since disbanded.

External links
 Granville assures Tobago United’s continued Pro League participation 
 

Football clubs in Trinidad and Tobago
2011 disestablishments in Trinidad and Tobago
Association football clubs disestablished in 2011
Tobago